The 2018–19 Biathlon World Cup – Mixed Relay started on Sunday 2 December 2018 in Pokljuka and finished on Thursday 14 March 2019 in Östersund. The defending team was Germany.

The winning team was Norway.

Competition format
The relay teams consist of four biathletes. Legs 1 and 2 are skied by the women, and legs 3 and 4 by the men. Every athlete's leg is skied over three laps, with two shooting rounds: one prone and one standing. For every round of five targets there are eight bullets available, though the last three can only be single-loaded manually from the spare round holders or from bullets deposited by the athlete into trays or onto the mat at the firing line. If after eight bullets there are still standing targets, one  penalty loop must be taken for each remaining target. The first-leg participants all start at the same time, and as in cross-country skiing relays, every athlete of a team must touch the team's next-leg participant to perform a valid changeover. On the first shooting stage of the first leg, the participant must shoot in the lane corresponding to their bib number (bib #10 shoots at lane #10 regardless of their position in the race), then for the remainder of the relay, the athletes shoot at the lane corresponding to the position they arrived (arrive at the range in 5th place, shoot at lane five).

The single mixed relay involves one male and one female biathlete each completing two legs consisting of one prone and one standing shoot. The female biathletes all start the race at the same time and complete one  leg before exchanging with their male counterparts who complete one  leg before exchanging again with the female skier who after completing another leg switches again with the male biathlete who completes the race. The rules regarding shooting are the same as in the regular mixed relay.

2017–18 Top 3 standings

Medal winners

Standings

References

Relay Mixed
Biathlon